Royal Bliss is an American rock band formed in 1997 in Salt Lake City, Utah. They were previously signed to Capitol Records and have released ten studio albums.

History

Background
Formed in 1997 in Salt Lake City, Utah, Royal Bliss regularly played to sold-out venues in Salt Lake City, Provo, Ogden, and Park City. They also played to sold-out crowds in a number of cities in California, Nevada, Idaho, Montana, Wyoming, Oregon, Washington, Illinois, Iowa, and Texas. In September, 2002 they played to a sold-out crowd at the Key Club in Hollywood and subsequently have been requested to come back to play. In March 2003, they headlined the Roxy Theatre and the show proved to be extremely successful.

In June 2007, Royal Bliss signed with Jason Flom CEO of Capitol Music Group. In August and September 2007, the band recorded a new CD at The Commune, a recording studio in Oregon, produced by Rob Daiker and engineered Matt Winegar.

Neal's accident
The members of Royal Bliss have had their share of trials and tribulations.
The band went through a period of time that included Neal falling about 35 feet from a balcony in Southern California. After nearly dying and being told that he will never walk again, Neal rehabilitated himself from almost complete paralysis of the lower half of his body and has even been seen playing soccer now and again, being a longtime player of the sport. The other members also were busy around the same time including, Jake becoming a father, Chris puncturing his face in a skiing accident and having to have reconstructive surgery, and Taylor breaking his foot, not to mention totaled cars, lawsuits, failed recording sessions and broken relationships.

"We've always told each other, as long as we keep moving steps forward, we'll never give up, we'll never quit," Middleton said. "As long as each year we advance as musicians and we advance as people, then we'll never give up. It's kind of like going to school to become a doctor for 8 or 10 years. That was our college, playing in a band."

Free Again (1998)
This appears to be the first CD that the band recorded in 1998 which had (7) seven songs. It included some longtime fan favorites such as "Love Song", and "Morning After". A heavy metal effort also made the cut on this first one titled “Blah”

Gimmie a Little Bliss (1999)
This CD is considered their debut EP and with a new type of rock incorporated with a strong Reggae vibe made the CDs sell quickly. They quickly sold out of about 3,500 units and had orders for more.

Old’s Cool (2001)
This CD was a compilation of the band's first two CD's, Free Again and Gimme A Little Bliss. It Also included two bonus live songs, "No Surprises" and a rough version of the band's current hit “Devils and Angels”

King Size (2001)
Their next CD titled King Size (2001) met with similar success. At the time of release, 5,000 copies were distributed to Media Play, Sam Goody, Warehouse Music and Gray Whale stores. This CD also quickly sold out and stores had to put in subsequent orders to accommodate the demand.   Many stores have had to struggle to keep this hot disc on the shelves since its release. Some of the more notable songs on this disc include “Now She’s Leaving”, “Drink and Smoke”, and the much requested fan favorites “Fine Wine” and “Roll One”.

After the Chaos (2005) and After the Chaos II (2006)
The aptly named Sixth CD After the Chaos is a reference to how after all the pain and suffering that they went through to record it. Producer Rob Daiker re-mixed the After The Chaos record and two more tracks where added to createAfter the Chaos II which has been described as "Royal Bliss at its best".

The band had started production of the CD in a million-dollar California studio, but after all that happened they ended up finishing it almost two years later in a home studio located in Salt Lake City. “It’s the first CD that all of us collectively agree that this is the one we need to go out and shop to labels and tour on and really push as heavily as we possibly can,” Middleton said. “For the first time, we’ve hired a radio promoter and we’ve hired a publicist and ended up signing a distribution deal” that will get After the Chaos II into stores nationwide, while giving Royal Bliss control of all the music.
Royal Bliss had opportunities to leave Salt Lake City for greener pastures, but “it’s always been our goal to come from Salt Lake City, because we believe the talent in Salt Lake deserves to be noticed.” And with the Internet, it’s even easier for bands to make an impact without leaving their hometowns.
Royal Bliss plans on touring and pushing After the Chaos II as far as it can. And with their recent travails now in the rearview mirror, band members are optimistic.
“It’s actually starting to feel better than it’s ever been before,” Middleton said. “We’re all feeling good and we’re all healthy. I still don’t have all the feeling back in my leg, but it doesn’t bother me.”. After the Chaos II is distributed under the label The Control Group.

Their single "Devils and Angels" featured on "After The Chaos II" received heavy rotation on KHTB/SLC, KZDX/Idaho, KCVI/Idaho, KOMP/Las Vegas, WIIL/Chicago, and KEYJ/Abilene, TX reaching a peak of 36 on the mediabase active rock charts. Having sold almost 30,000 copies of After the Chaos II, in June 2007, Royal Bliss signed with Jason Flom while CEO of Capitol Music Group.

Life In-Between (2009)

Royal Bliss's new album marks the next chapter in the ongoing saga of Royal Bliss, as their first major label release under Capitol Records. Life In-Between was released 13 January 2009 as a joint collaboration between Merovingian Music and Caroline Records under the exclusive license to Capitol Records.  Showing strong first week sales, Life In Between debuted at number 151 on The Billboard 200 (Top 200 albums in retail sales) and number 4 on Billboard Top Heatseekers (The best-selling albums by new and developing acts, defined as those who have never appeared in the top 100 of The Billboard 200).

The album's first single, Save Me, was released 15 July 2008. It is currently available for sale digitally at all major online retailers (iTunes, Amazon, Rhapsody, etc.). The song impacted radio only one day earlier on the 14th with a total of 11 adds at radio and climbing to 25 within a few days. Merovingian Music (abrv MRV) has released two web sites to accompany and promote the new single Save Me. The first is an interactive e-card which provides to anyone that maybe unfamiliar, an excellent introduction to the band. The second is a media packed web tools site for those who want to take action and promote, this site provides to the public a plethora of marketing tools and the necessary knowledge to use them effectively.

In October 2008 the band's label released the first video single for the song, Save Me. The video features a protagonist puppet used to explore the band's tormented psyche and shows the devolution and decline of the human condition when all hope is lost. A masked man in stop-motion symbolizes the character in a state of emotional decay and turmoil as he morphs into an actual puppet who is void of feeling, emotion and life itself. Thus symbolizing the fight is over and a lost of all resemblance of former self and has now become completely dehumanized.  Here is a recent 2009 interview with the band: http://app.synclive.com?show/29552.

In November 2009 the band released an acoustic EP entitled from a performance at the legendary Studio A that was produced by the band and their Manager Sam Kaiser. They also release a Christmas single which included the b-side "Music Man", a fan favorite.

Waiting Out the Storm (2012)
The band has said that in February 2010 they will start recording a new album. The band self released  "Waiting Out The Storm" in January 2012 and worked two singles off the record, "I Got This" and "Crazy". Both singles failed to chart on the top 40 active rock chart but made the Top 10 in Rock and Top 70 Overall on iTunes. The band continues to tour.

Chasing the Sun (2014)
Royal Bliss had stated that they were going to release a new album in late 2013 or early 2014. The band funded the money to make the album by using the Kickstarter program. Neal Middleton stated: "We wanted to try something new, and Kickstarter was a great option. We could involve the fans in a new way and really make them part of the process. Hell they even picked out the CD cover for us. So yes I do think it’s a good way for bands to raise money and to also get to know their fans". The band released their 8th album entitled "Chasing The Sun" on February 18, 2014. This album features the single "Cry Sister." Cry Sister was released on October 29, 2013 and charted at number 31 on the Mediabase Active Rock Chart. The album also includes the present single "Turn Me On."

The Truth (2016)
The EP was co-written with the songwriting powerhouse duo Monty Powell and Anna Wilson. The video bands unofficial first single "We're All Livin The Dream" successfully landed a World Premiere on all 16 of CMT's broadcast outlets and a featured spot on CMT's website. "The Truth" hits all digital retailers June 3, 2016. The EP debuted at No. 28 on the Top Country Albums chart, and No. 19 on the Hard Rock Albums chart, with 1,500 copies sold in its first week.

In October and November of 2018, the group plans to tour with American rock bands Messer and Joyous Wolf.

Band members

Current
Neal Middleton—lead vocals (1998-present)
Taylor Richards—guitar
Jake Smith—drums
Brian Hennesy-bass guitar

Former 
David Lee Roth—lead vocals (1997-1998)

The Voice
In 2012, band member and vocalist Neal Middleton took part in auditions to the second season of the American reality television series The Voice. On the program broadcast on February 6, 2012, he sang "I Heard It Through the Grapevine" from Marvin Gaye. But none of the 4 judges, namely Adam Levine, Cee-Lo Green, Christina Aguilera and Blake Shelton hit their "I Want You" buttons and Neal Middleton was eliminated.

Discography

Studio albums
2005: After the Chaos
2006: After the Chaos II
2009: Life In-Between
2012: Waiting Out the Storm
2014: Chasing The Sun
2016: The Truth
2019: Royal Bliss

Independent albums
1998: Free Again
1999: Gimmie a Little Bliss
2001: King Size

EPs
2009: Live and Acoustic in Studio A
2009: I Just Want You (For Christmas)

Compilations
2001: Old’s Cool
2012: 15 Years: 1997-2012

Singles

Music videos

References

External links 
Royal Bliss official web site
Map of Royal Bliss tour dates
Royal Bliss on Channel One News

Alternative rock groups from Utah
Musical groups established in 1997
American post-grunge musical groups
1997 establishments in Utah